Podolasia is a genus of May beetles and junebugs in the family Scarabaeidae. There are about 11 described species in Podolasia.

Species
These 11 species belong to the genus Podolasia:
 Podolasia emarginata Howden, 1954 i c g
 Podolasia ferruginea (LeConte, 1856) i c g
 Podolasia involucris Howden, 1998 i c g
 Podolasia lavignei Howden, 1997 i c g
 Podolasia longipenis Howden, 1997 c g
 Podolasia longipennis Howden, 1997 i
 Podolasia peninsularis Howden, 1954 i c g
 Podolasia pilosa Howden, 1954 i c g
 Podolasia rotundipenis Howden, 1997 i c g
 Podolasia stillwellorum Howden, 1997 i c g b
 Podolasia varicolor Saylor, 1948 i c g
Data sources: i = ITIS, c = Catalogue of Life, g = GBIF, b = Bugguide.net

References

Further reading

 
 
 
 
 

Melolonthinae
Articles created by Qbugbot